The 1832 United States presidential election in Rhode Island took place between November 2 and December 5, 1832, as part of the 1832 United States presidential election. Voters chose four representatives, or electors to the Electoral College, who voted for President and Vice President.

Rhode Island voted for the National Republican candidate, Henry Clay, over the Democratic Party candidate, Andrew Jackson. Clay won Rhode Island by a margin of 13.86%.

Results

See also
 United States presidential elections in Rhode Island

References

Rhode Island
1832
1832 Rhode Island elections